Edigerson Gomes D'Almeida (born 17 November 1988) is a Bissau-Guinean professional footballer who plays as a centre-back for the Guinea-Bissau national team.

Early life
Gomes was born in Guinea-Bissau and moved to Portugal at the age of 6 with his mother. However, when he was 11, he moved with his father and Danish stepmother to Denmark.

Club career
Gomes started his professional football career when he was promoted to the Danish club Herlev IF's senior squad within the 2011–12 league season.

Gomes made his professional debut with Esbjerg in the qualifying of the Europa League in a match against Kairat 17 July 2014. Four days later, he appeared in his first top level match in the Superliga, in a 1–0 victory against Randers.

On 21 January 2015, Gomes transferred to Chinese Super League side Henan Jianye.

Left without club, Gomes trained with his former club, HB Køge, in 2020. He signed a short deal with the club on 21 May 2020 for the rest of the season. In July 2020, he signed a new one-year deal with Køge. In May 2021, Gomes once again signed a contract extension with Køge, this time until the end of 2022. However, on 31 January 2022 it was confirmed, that Gomes' contract had been terminated by mutual agreement.

International career
Gomes represented Denmark Olympic at the 2016 Summer Olympics as one of the three allowed players with no age limit. At the end of May 2017, he agreed to play officially for Guinea-Bissau. He made his international debut on 10 June 2017 and scored the only goal of the match against Namibia.

Personal life
Gomes also holds Portuguese and Danish citizenship.

References

External links

1988 births
Living people
Sportspeople from Bissau
Bissau-Guinean footballers
Association football central defenders
Henan Songshan Longmen F.C. players
Fimleikafélag Hafnarfjarðar players
Chinese Super League players
Úrvalsdeild karla (football) players
Guinea-Bissau international footballers
Bissau-Guinean expatriate footballers
Bissau-Guinean expatriate sportspeople in China
Expatriate footballers in China
Bissau-Guinean expatriate sportspeople in Iceland
Expatriate footballers in Iceland
Bissau-Guinean emigrants to Denmark
Naturalised citizens of Denmark
Danish men's footballers
Herlev IF players
HB Køge players
Esbjerg fB players
Danish 1st Division players
Danish Superliga players
Olympic footballers of Denmark
Footballers at the 2016 Summer Olympics
Danish people of Bissau-Guinean descent